Victoria Machinery Depot Ltd. was a historic metalworks and shipyard in Victoria, Canada.

Establishment
From the late 1850s, with the Fraser Canyon and Cariboo Gold Rushes, British Columbia was dependent upon Californian supplies and ships. To prevent US domination of the colony, Governor James Douglas enacted laws restricting US shipping. As a consequence, Joseph Spratt established the Albion Iron Works on May 4, 1863.

Restructured operations
Albion Iron Works went through several business changes and merged with Victoria Machinery Depot (VMD), assuming the latter's name in 1888. After a fire in 1908 destroyed the plant, the facility was rebuilt. The yard did essential war work in both world wars. Harold Husband purchased the company in 1947 for $185,000.

A 1954 fire caused $100,000 damage to the storage shed on Dallas road. Later, the yard built several BC Ferries vessels.

During 1965–1967, it constructed the oil drilling platform Sedco 135-F for exploration by Shell Canada in Hecate Strait. At the time, Sedco 135-F was the largest semi-submersible platform in the world and was the first platform constructed in BC. After the 1967 launch and three years of exploration off the British Columbia coast, it was towed to oilfields in New Zealand, the North Sea, and the Gulf of Mexico. Sedco 135-F is often confused with  the rig that suffered the blowout resulting in the Ixtoc I oil spill. That was the original Sedco 135, the first of the series built at Ingalls Shipbuilding in 1965. Sedco 135-F was one of the last seagoing vessels built by VMD.

The company turned to pressure vessels and submarines, but the firm closed permanently in 1994, joining the business contractions of that decade.

The yards were one of several contractors to the Royal Canadian Navy for ship repair and maintenance.

Facilities

The first shipyard was constructed on Bay Street between Pleasant Street and Turner Street. A second yard was built near what is now Ogden Point Terminal.

Ships built

Miscellaneous vessels

 Hull 6 SS  – 1902, built for the Hudson's Bay Company.
 Hull 136 Sedco 135-F – 1967, at 8,676 gross register tonnage it was one of the largest vessels built by VMD.

Warships

 Hull 58  – 1959 
 Hull 87  – 1959–1961  moved to Yarrows Shipyards for completion in September 1961.

Ferries

 Hull 52 MV Lloyd Jones – 1950, later known as Vesuvius Queen. (see also Steamboats of Lake Okanagan)
 Hull 79  – 1956 built for Coast Ferries Ltd., purchased by BC Ferries in 1969.
 Hull 85 MV Sidney – 1960, later Queen Of Sidney – 1963.
 Hull 94 MV City of Victoria – 1962, later Queen of Victoria 1963, Queen of Ocoa 2000, Aan 2005, scrapped 2006.
 Hull 99 MV Queen of Saanich – 1963
 Hull 100 MV Queen of Esquimalt – 1963
 Hull 104  – 1964

 Hull 105  – 1964
 Hull 107 MV Comox Queen – 1964 built for the Ministry of Transportation, later .
 Hull 125 MV Queen of Burnaby – 1965
 Hull 129 MV Powell River Queen – 1965
 Hull 130 MV Mayne Queen – 1965
 Hull 131 MV Bowen Queen – 1965
 Hull 124  – 1966
 Hull 145 MV Doris Yorke – 1968, now Seaspan Doris (a truck and rail ferry), was the last vessel constructed by VMD.
 Sternwheeler Inlander - 1910. She was the last sternwheeler serving the Skeena River. Scrapped in 1912 at Port Essington.

See also 
 List of oil spills
 Transocean – recent company that owns part of the remnants of the former South East Drilling Company (SEDCO)

References 

Marine engine manufacturers
Shipbuilding companies of Canada
Former defence companies of Canada
History of Victoria, British Columbia
Companies established in 1863
Companies disestablished in 1994
Engine manufacturers of Canada
Companies based in Victoria, British Columbia
Defunct manufacturing companies of Canada